Colobothea osculatii is a species of beetle in the family Cerambycidae. It was described by Félix Édouard Guérin-Méneville in 1855. It is known from Ecuador and Peru.

References

osculatii
Beetles described in 1855